The Duck darter (Etheostoma planasaxatile) is a rare species of freshwater ray-finned fish, a darter from the subfamily Etheostomatinae, part of the family Percidae, which also contains the perches, ruffes and pikeperches. It is endemic to the eastern United States, where it occurs in the Duck River drainage in Tennessee.  It inhabits current-swept rocky pools and adjacent riffles of creeks and small to medium rivers.

References

Etheostoma
Fish described in 2007
Taxa named by Steven L. Powers
Taxa named by Richard L. Mayden